Paul Souriau (1852–1926) was a French philosopher known for his works on invention theory and aesthetics.

Biography
He studied at the École normale supérieure where he wrote a doctoral thesis entitled Théorie de l'invention published in 1881. In his thesis, he argues that inventions are not the result of a rigorous scientific method but rather come as a deterministic consequence of a set of conditions in which the inventor lives. This theory was contested very soon after its publication in the 1882 edition of the Revue Internationale de l'Enseignement. The French thesis was created simultaneously with a Latin thesis titled De motus perceptione. The Latin thesis emphasized the importance of vision in movement perception, hence the initial title De visione motus. The thesis was a precursor for his later works on movement perception.

He became a professor at the Faculté des Lettres de Lille (now University of Lille) very soon after its foundation in 1887. In 1889, he published his reflections on the aesthetics of movement. The book described two levels of movement aesthetics: the mechanical beauty (the adaptation of the movement to fulfil its goal) and the movement expression (the meaning of the movement for an observer). By doing so Souriau distinguished movement from perception of movement, two concepts which later became the subjects of studies of motor cognition and psychophysics. A few years after this publication, in 1892 Souriau's wife gave birth to their son Étienne, who was an influential philosopher of aesthetics.

Throughout his career, but more particularly during the first decade of the 20th century, he published his reflections on the aesthetics of arts while being a professor at the University of Nancy. Throughout his life, Félix Alcan was his main editor.

References

External links
 
 
 Paul Souriau's bibliography, OpenLibrary.

1852 births
1926 deaths
French philosophers
Academic staff of the University of Lorraine
Philosophers of art
French male non-fiction writers